A pianist is an individual musician who plays the piano. Since most forms of Western music can make use of the piano, pianists have a wide repertoire and a wide variety of styles to choose from, among them traditional classical music, jazz, blues, and all sorts of popular music, including rock and roll. Most pianists can, to an extent, easily play other keyboard-related instruments such as the synthesizer, harpsichord, celesta, and the organ.

Pianists past and present
Modern classical pianists dedicate their careers to performing, recording, teaching, researching, and learning new works to expand their repertoire. They generally do not write or transcribe music as pianists did in the 19th century. Some classical pianists might specialize in accompaniment and chamber music, while others (though comparatively few) will perform as full-time soloists.

Classical 

Mozart could be considered the first "concert pianist" as he performed widely on the piano. Composers Beethoven and Clementi from the classical era were also famed for their playing, as were, from the romantic era, Liszt, Brahms, Chopin, Mendelssohn, Rachmaninoff, and Schumann. It was during the Classical period that the piano begins to establish its place in the hearts and homes of everyday people. From that era, leading performers less known as composers were Clara Schumann and Hans von Bülow. However, as we do not have modern audio recordings of most of these pianists, we rely mainly on written commentary to give us an account of their technique and style.

Jazz 
Jazz pianists almost always perform with other musicians. Their playing is more free than that of classical pianists, and they create an air of spontaneity in their performances. They generally do not write down their compositions; improvisation is a significant part of their work. Well known jazz pianists include Bill Evans, Art Tatum, Duke Ellington, Thelonious Monk, Oscar Peterson, Bud Powell, McCoy Tyner, and Herbie Hancock.

Pop and rock
Popular pianists might work as live performers (concert, theatre, etc.) or session musicians. Arrangers most likely feel at home with synthesizers and other electronic keyboard instruments. Notable popular pianists include Victor Borge who performed as a comedian; Richard Clayderman, who is known for his covers of popular tunes; and singer and entertainer Liberace, who at the height of his fame, was one of the highest-paid entertainers in the world.

Well-known pianists
A single listing of pianists in all genres would be impractical, given the multitude of musicians noted for their performances on the instrument.  Below are links to lists of well-known or influential pianists divided by genres:

Classical pianists
List of classical pianists (recorded)
List of classical pianists
List of classical piano duos (performers)

Jazz pianists
List of jazz pianists

Pop and rock music pianists
List of pop and rock pianists

Blues pianists
List of blues musicians
List of boogie woogie musicians

Gospel pianists
List of gospel musicians

New-age pianists
List of new-age music artists

Pianist-composers
Many important composers were also virtuoso pianists. The following is an incomplete list of such musicians.

Classical period
Muzio Clementi
Wolfgang Amadeus Mozart
Ludwig van Beethoven
Johann Nepomuk Hummel
Carl Maria von Weber
Myra Hess
Franz Schubert
Clara Schuman 
Angela Hewitt

Romantic period
Felix Mendelssohn
Frédéric Chopin
Robert Schumann
Franz Liszt
Charles-Valentin Alkan
Anton Rubinstein
Johannes Brahms
Camille Saint-Saëns
Edvard Grieg
Isaac Albéniz
Anton Arensky
Alexander Scriabin
Sergei Rachmaninoff
Nikolai Medtner

Modern period
Claude Debussy
Ferruccio Busoni
Maurice Ravel
Béla Bartók
Sergei Prokofiev
George Gershwin
Dmitri Shostakovich
Alberto Ginastera
Olga Kern

Contemporary period 

 Cory Henry
 Jacob Collier
 Jon Batiste
 Tigran Hamasyan
 Anna Fedorova 
 Beatrice Rana 
 Yuja Wang
 Imogen Cooper
 Mitsuko Uchida

Amateur pianism

Some people, having received a solid piano training in their youth, decide not to continue their musical careers but choose nonmusical ones. As a result, there are prominent communities of amateur pianists all over the world that play at quite a high level and give concerts not to earn money but just for the love of music. The International Piano Competition for Outstanding Amateurs, held annually in Paris, attracts about one thousand listeners each year and is broadcast on French radio.

It is notable that Jon Nakamatsu, the Gold Medal winner of the Van Cliburn International Piano Competition for professional pianists in Fort Worth, Texas (1997) was at the moment of his victory technically an amateur: he never attended a music conservatory or majored in music, and worked as a high school German teacher at the time; it was only after the competition that he started pursuing a career as a classical pianist.

The German pianist Davide Martello is known for traveling around conflict zones to play his moving piano. Martello has previously been recognized by the European Parliament for his "outstanding contribution to European cooperation and the promotion of common values".

See also 
 List of films about pianists

 List of University and College Schools of Music 
 List of Piano Brand Names

References 

Articles containing video clips
Occupations in music
 
 
id:Piano